Sparrow Trout Heart Sprout is an album by Akron/Family member Seth Olinsky, released in 2007 under the name Best of Seth. Material from this album originally formed the basis of a CD-R, which was distributed by Akron/Family in the months prior to the release of their self-titled first album on Young God Records. The songs were later remastered by Doug Henderson at the Brooklyn-based studio Micro Moose, and sold in an elaborately packaged edition of 500 copies.

Track listing
Disc 1 Trout
"Dirt Road Cloud of Light" – 4:25
"Rainbow Trout" – 4:37
"No Dada for You Baba" – 4:14
"Song for Chris and Ed" - 2:42
"Always Gone" – 3:58
"It's So Hard" – 3:20
"Sparks" – 3:32
"Meek Warrior" – 2:01
"Ground" - 6:02
"Beard Rock" - 1:35
"Responsible for the Weather" - 4:29
"The Only Home" - 1:36
"Noah" - 3:28
"Dream Girl" - 2:06
"Top of the Mountain" - 5:52
"The Littlest Horse" - 1:37

Disc 2 Sun
"As It Was in the Beginning, Is Now" - 3:14
"Sun Comes Up" - 5:27
"Space/Love --> Space is Love" - 5:52
"Lord Open My Heart" - 3:04
"Sunspots" - 3:50
"No Space in This Realm" - 5:00
"Come to Terms (With What's Going On)" - 5:21
"Blessing Force" - 2:15
"Where the Grass Tells Me" - 4:25
"If On the Path" - 5:23
"What Point Was Come" - 3:30
"Space/Love" - 2:31
"I Once Was As It Was" - 2:17

Disc 3 Sparrow
"World of Difference" - 2:37
"Death Sparrow Blues" - 6:31
"I've Had Enough" - 3:28
"Sofie" - 5:27
"Finland, Masked in Lupins" - 5:59
"Saddest Turtle" - 0:42
"Don't Seem Right" - 3:29
"Ali, Ali" - 2:25
"Rinpoche Said" - 3:27
"Ghost of Katie" - 6:15
"And Everything" - 3:12
"Sun Goes Down" - 2:17
"On the Battlefield/Authentic Man" - 9:39

References 

2007 albums
Akron/Family albums
Albums produced by Doug Henderson (musician)